Rajah Serfoji Government College is a government college in Thanjavur, Tamilnadu, India. This college is affiliated to Bharathidasan University, Thiruchiraplli. It is located in the heart of the Thanjavur city.

Academics
The college currently provides 9 Ph. D., 9 M.Phil., 11 post-graduates, 13 undergraduates educational programmes which are affiliated with Bharathidasan University, Tiruchirappalli. Undergraduate programmes are also offered in regional language (Tamil).

Departments

Arts
 Tamil
 English
 Economics
 History

Science
 Physics
 Chemistry
 Mathematics
 Zoology
 Botany
 Biochemistry
 Statistics
 Computer Science
 Biotechnology

Commerce

Business Administration

NIRF
Rajah Serfoji Government College (Autonomous), Thanjavur is ranked in the rank band of 101-150 among colleges in India by the National Institutional Ranking Framework (NIRF) in 2022.

Thinkers' Club
Thinkers' Club is an initiative of English and Biotechnology Departments in order to exhibit the talents of young minds.

Notable alumni
 M. Sankaran, Director of U R Rao Satellite Centre (URSC), Bangalore
 Dr. B. Kadalmani, Associate Professor of Animal Science, Bharathidasan University

References

External links

Arts colleges in India
Education in Thanjavur
Educational institutions established in 1955
1955 establishments in Madras State
Colleges affiliated to Bharathidasan University
Academic institutions formerly affiliated with the University of Madras